Eli Bornstein  (born December 28, 1922) is an American-born Canadian artist and teacher who has spent most of his life in Saskatchewan, Canada.

He is known for his three-dimensional reliefs.

Early years
Eli Bornstein was born in Milwaukee, Wisconsin on December 28, 1922.

He studied at the Chicago Art Institute for a short period in 1943, then went to the Milwaukee State Teachers' College, graduating with a BSc in 1945.
From 1943 to 1947 he was a teacher at the Milwaukee Art Institute.

In 1949 Bornstein taught design at the University of Wisconsin in Milwaukee.

Career
In 1950 Bornstein became head of the newly established Department of Fine Arts at the University of Saskatchewan.
During his summer breaks he studied in Paris, France at the Académie de Montmartre of Fernand Léger in 1951 and at the Académie Julian in 1952.
He also studied at the University of Wisconsin–Madison, and obtained an MSc in 1954.
Bornstein resigned from his position as head of the Fine Arts department in 1971.
Bornstein became a Canadian citizen in 1972.
He continued to teach art at the University of Saskatchewan until 1990, when he retired.

Bornstein's early drawings, paintings, prints and sculptures used abstract and cubist techniques to depict nature.
In 1956 he won a commission from the Saskatchewan Teacher's Federation to make an abstract welded aluminum sculpture named "Growth Motif".
He began to make three-dimensional "structurist" reliefs during a sabbatical in Italy and the Netherlands in 1957.
In Europe he met and was influenced by artists such as Jean Gorin, Joost Baljeu, Anthony Hill, Kenneth Martin, Mary Martin, Victor Pasmore and Georges Vantongerloo.

In 1960 he founded The Structurist, a journal that appears annually or biannually with each edition devoted to a particular theme.
The journal was published by the University of Saskatchewan until 2010.
As of 2017 he was still actively working.
Bornstein is one of the most influential senior artists in the Canadian Prairies region.

Work
Bornstein's reliefs are made of multiple planes whose shadows vary with changing light.
They combine color, form, and space.
He says that in color they have roots in Claude Monet and the impressionists, and in form they derive from the work of Paul Cézanne, Kazimir Malevich and cubism. 
Piet Mondrian has influenced both their color and their form.
Bornstein used a single ground plane for his early reliefs, with forms mounted on that plane. In 1966 he made his first works with two planes.
Later he began experimenting with multiple planes.

In 1964 his massive frieze named Structural Relief in Fifteen Parts was installed in the Richardson Airport terminal in Winnipeg, Canada.
This early work used primary colors and a small number of rectangular forms.
Over time the reliefs have become more complex in their form and color.
Sometimes Bornstein would work on one relief for three to five years.
Although abstract, the works of painted aluminum evoke the forms and colours of the landscape of Saskatchewan.
Bornstein is also known for his large sculptures.

Exhibitions and collections
Bornstein has exhibited in solo and group shows in Canada, the United States and Europe. 
Some of Bornstein's major work are held in the Winnipeg International Air Terminal (1962, now at the University of Manitoba in Winnipeg), Wascana Centre Authority building in Regina (1982) and Canadian Light Source building in Saskatoon (2004).
His Hexaplane Structurist Construction No. 1 was made for Jacobs University Bremen in Germany, and his Hexaplane Structurist Construction No. 2 for the University of Manitoba in Winnipeg.
Collections that hold his work include:
Canadian Centre for Architecture (Montreal)
Canada Council Art Bank (Ottawa)
National Gallery of Canada (Ottawa)
Saskatchewan Arts Board (Regina)
Walker Art Center (Minneapolis)
Museum of Art Fort Lauderdale, (Florida)
Mendel Art Gallery (Saskatoon)
Klein (Los Angeles).

References

Sources

1922 births
Living people
Artists from Milwaukee
Members of the Order of Canada
Members of the Saskatchewan Order of Merit
School of the Art Institute of Chicago alumni
University of Wisconsin–Madison alumni
University of Wisconsin–Milwaukee alumni
University of Wisconsin–Milwaukee faculty
Academic staff of the University of Saskatchewan
Artists from Saskatchewan
American emigrants to Canada